The 1988 All-Ireland Senior Camogie Championship Final was the 57th All-Ireland Final and the deciding match of the 1988 All-Ireland Senior Camogie Championship, an inter-county camogie tournament for the top teams in Ireland.

Despite Cork's best efforts, they trailed 3-3 to 1-5 at half-time and Kilkenny won their fourth title in a row. Breda Holmes was top scorer with 2-2.

References

All-Ireland Senior Camogie Championship Finals
All-Ireland Senior Camogie Championship Final
All-Ireland Senior Camogie Championship Final
All-Ireland Senior Camogie Championship Final, 1988